The 1957 Detroit Tigers season was a season in American baseball. The team finished fourth in the American League with a record of 78–76, 20 games behind the New York Yankees. The team scored 614 runs and allowed 614 runs for a run differential of zero.

Offseason
 February 8, 1957: Jim Brideweser was purchased from the Tigers by the Baltimore Orioles.

Regular season 
 April 18, 1957: Roger Maris hit the first home run of his career. It came at Briggs Stadium in Detroit and was a grand slam off Tigers pitcher Jack Crimian.

Season standings

Record vs. opponents

Notable transactions 
 June 14, 1957: Earl Torgeson was traded by the Tigers to the Chicago White Sox for Dave Philley.
 August 1, 1957: Johnny Groth was purchased by the Tigers from the Kansas City Athletics.
 August 27, 1957: Al Aber was selected off waivers from the Tigers by the Kansas City Athletics.

Roster

Player stats

Batting

Starters by position 
Note: Pos = Position; G = Games played; AB = At bats; H = Hits; Avg. = Batting average; HR = Home runs; RBI = Runs batted in

Other batters 
Note: G = Games played; AB = At bats; H = Hits; Avg. = Batting average; HR = Home runs; RBI = Runs batted in

Pitching

Starting pitchers 
Note: G = Games pitched; IP = Innings pitched; W = Wins; L = Losses; ERA = Earned run average; SO = Strikeouts

Other pitchers 
Note: G = Games pitched; IP = Innings pitched; W = Wins; L = Losses; ERA = Earned run average; SO = Strikeouts

Relief pitchers 
Note: G = Games pitched; W = Wins; L = Losses; SV = Saves; ERA = Earned run average; SO = Strikeouts

Farm system 

LEAGUE CHAMPIONS: Durham

References

External links 

1957 Detroit Tigers season at Baseball Reference

Detroit Tigers seasons
Detroit Tigers season
Detroit Tigers
1957 in Detroit